Rifaat El-Fanagily (1 May 1936, in Damietta – 23 June 2004) was an Egyptian footballer who played as a midfielder for Al-Ahly. He also played for the Egyptian national team, and was part of the team that won the 1957 and 1959 Africa Cup of Nations, and represented his country in the 1960 and 1964 Summer Olympics.

Honours
Al Ahly
 Egyptian Premier League: 1953–54, 1955–56, 1956–57, 1957–58, 1958–59, 1960–61, 1961–62
 Egypt Cup: 1952–53, 1955–56, 1957–58, 1960–61, 1965–66
Egypt
 Africa Cup of Nations: 1957, 1959

References

External links
 

1936 births
2004 deaths
People from Damietta
Egyptian footballers
Association football midfielders
Egypt international footballers
Al Ahly SC players
1957 African Cup of Nations players
1959 African Cup of Nations players
1962 African Cup of Nations players
1963 African Cup of Nations players
Olympic footballers of Egypt
Footballers at the 1960 Summer Olympics
Footballers at the 1964 Summer Olympics
Africa Cup of Nations-winning players
Egyptian Premier League players